Cham Kushk-e Tulabi (also Romanized as Cham Kūshk-e Ţūlābī) is a village in Darb-e Gonbad Rural District, Darb-e Gonbad District, Kuhdasht County, Lorestan Province, Iran. At the 2006 census, its population was 585, in 134 families.

References 

Towns and villages in Kuhdasht County